30th Anniversary Tour: Live is the fourth live album by George Thorogood and the Destroyers.  It was recorded on May 4, 2004 at the Royal Concert Hall in Nottingham, England, and released on October 19, 2004 on the Eagle Records label.  The performance was also released on DVD, and as a CD/DVD collectors' edition.

Track listing

In addition to the above, the DVD of the concert offers two extra performances: "Move It On Over" and "You Talk Too Much".  The DVD bonus features include a promotional video for "American Made", and acoustic performances of "Ride 'Til I Die" and "Merry Christmas Baby".

References

George Thorogood and the Destroyers live albums
2004 live albums
Eagle Records live albums